Seward County is a county in the U.S. state of Nebraska. As of the 2010 United States Census, the population was 16,750. Its county seat is Seward. The county was formed in 1855, and was organized in 1867. It was originally called Greene County, and in 1862 it was renamed for William H. Seward, United States Secretary of State under Abraham Lincoln and Andrew Johnson. Seward County is part of the Lincoln, NE Metropolitan Statistical Area.

In the Nebraska license plate system, Seward County is represented by the prefix 16 (it had the sixteenth-largest number of vehicles registered in the county when the license plate system was established in 1922).

Geography
The Seward County terrain consists of low rolling hills, largely dedicated to agriculture including center pivot irrigation. The Big Blue River flows south-southeasterly through the central part of the county.

Major highways

  Interstate 80
  U.S. Highway 6
  U.S. Highway 34
  Nebraska Highway 15
  Nebraska Highway 103

Adjacent counties

 Butler County – north
 Lancaster County – east
 Saline County – south
 Fillmore County – southwest
 York County – west
 Polk County – northwest

Protected areas

 Bur Oak State Wildlife Management Area
 Freeman Lakes Waterfowl Production Area
 North Lake Basin State Wildlife Management Area
 Oak Glen State Wildlife Management Area
 Tamora Waterfowl Production Area

Demographics

As of the 2000 United States Census, there were 16,496 people, 6,013 households, and 4,215 families in the county. The population density was 29 people per square mile (11/km2). There were 6,428 housing units at an average density of 11 per square mile (4/km2). The racial makeup of the county was 98.05% White, 0.28% Black or African American, 0.21% Native American, 0.29% Asian, 0.05% Pacific Islander, 0.40% from other races, and 0.72% from two or more races. 1.09% of the population were Hispanic or Latino of any race.

There were 6,013 households, out of which 32.80% had children under the age of 18 living with them, 61.50% were married couples living together, 5.60% had a female householder with no husband present, and 29.90% were non-families. 24.90% of all households were made up of individuals, and 12.10% had someone living alone who was 65 years of age or older. The average household size was 2.53 and the average family size was 3.04.

The county population contained 24.70% under the age of 18, 14.30% from 18 to 24, 24.60% from 25 to 44, 21.20% from 45 to 64, and 15.20% who were 65 years of age or older. The median age was 36 years. For every 100 females, there were 103.20 males. For every 100 females age 18 and over, there were 102.50 males.

The median income for a household in the county was $42,700, and the median income for a family was $51,813. Males had a median income of $32,218 versus $22,329 for females. The per capita income for the county was $18,379.  About 4.10% of families and 7.00% of the population were below the poverty line, including 6.20% of those under age 18 and 6.80% of those age 65 or over.

Communities

Cities
 Milford
 Seward (county seat)

Villages

 Beaver Crossing
 Bee
 Cordova
 Garland
 Goehner
 Pleasant Dale
 Staplehurst
 Utica

Census-designated place
 Tamora

Unincorporated communities
 Grover
 Ruby

Ghost town
 Pittsburg

Politics
Seward County voters are reliably Republican. In only one national election since 1936 has the county selected the Democratic Party candidate (as of 2020).

See also
 National Register of Historic Places listings in Seward County, Nebraska

References

External links
 Connect Seward County

 
Lincoln, Nebraska metropolitan area
1867 establishments in Nebraska
Populated places established in 1867